Censier–Daubenton is a station on Line 7 of the Paris Métro. It opened on 15 February 1930 as part of a planned section of the line, which was temporarily operated as part of Line 10 until the completion of the under-Seine crossing of Line 7 from Pont de Sully to Place Monge. The station was integrated into Line 7 on 26 April 1931.

It is named after the streets of Rue Censier and Rue Daubenton. Censier is the name of the locality. Louis-Jean-Marie Daubenton was a naturalist who collaborated with Georges-Louis Leclerc, Comte de Buffon on his Histoire Naturelle (French for "Natural History"). Daubenton was the first director of the nearby natural history museum, the Muséum national d'Histoire naturelle. Prior to  1965, the station was known as Censier-Daubenton halle aux cuirs. Halle aux cuirs is French for "leather market" and  referred to the leather market along the Bièvre River, which is now covered in the area.

Nearby
Saint-Médard church
Muséum national d'histoire naturelle (natural history museum)
Institut national agronomique Paris-Grignon (a former Grandes école, now part of the Paris Institute of Technology for Life, Food and Environmental Sciences)
Rue Mouffetard
University of Paris III: Sorbonne Nouvelle

Station layout

Gallery

References
Roland, Gérard (2003). Stations de métro. D’Abbesses à Wagram. Éditions Bonneton.

External links

Paris Métro stations in the 5th arrondissement of Paris
Railway stations in France opened in 1930